C.G.S. colony (Antop Hill, Mumbai) is Asia's largest housing colony to provide housing to employees and staff of any central government body/organisation. C.G.S. is derived from Central Government Employees Society - the "E" is not used usually because saying "CGS" is much easier and faster than saying "CGES", but C.G.E.S. is the official short-form. The colony is located approximately mid-way of the King's Circle and Koliwada or Guru Tegh Bahadur Nagar railway stations. Walking time between C.G.S. and both stations is an average of 20 minutes.

C.G.S. colony consists of seven sectors, I through VII and the buildings are graded according to the number of rooms each apartment (or flat) of the building contains. In C.G.S Colony Sector 7 is larger than the other Sectors. There is also a Kendriya Vidyalaya school in Sector 1 for the employees and staff of any central government body/organisation And there is also a ground for playing which is in Sector-6 Called Cement Ground. The allocation of the apartment type to an individual is based on his/her ranking within the central government body/organisation. Lately, many of the buildings in the colony have been marked as unsafe and the task of rebuilding them is under way.

following are the sectors and there main spots :-

Sec -1 : 1 hospital, grih kalyan kendra- school for nursery Jr.kg and Sr.kg kids and the same building consists of  waiting houses i.e. a newly transferred person can stay there until his house is allotted . post office - which has been shut from years now. Garden - there is a very beautiful garden for jogging, playing  etc. and government apartments.

Sec-2 : Shiv mandir and government apartments.

Sec -3 : Sai mandir, hanuman madir, Nav chetna and other government apartments.

Sec-4: Balwadi nursery school and government apartments.

Sec-5 : Nav jevan(same building different location aka twin of nav chetna) and other government apartment. And many restaurants and gurdwaras.

Sec-6: Antophill police station, cement ground, garden, many general and vegetable shops/ hawkers. Govt. apartments.

Sec-7 : It literally has everything you need for living. Starting from fruits, vegetable meat and other grocery shops, having street foods, military canteen, Sanjeevani hospital, another but bigger grih kalyan kendra. It also has different and many colonies in it. Have many gardens and ground and many Govt. apartments and covers huge area.

Apart from these sectors there are many other things just next to antophill like ATM, salon, barber shop, bakery, domino's  sweet shops an endless list + metro stop just in front of sec-1. Many bus stops throughout the antophill and nearby. Many studios and classes. Many temples and gurdwaras and a church and a masjid. and it is closest to gandhi market which has everything which you can ever ask for from low brand cloths to showroom and from street food to restaurants........ this is antophill.

Neighbourhoods in Mumbai